The 1934 Paris–Nice was the second edition of the Paris–Nice cycle race and was held from 7 March to 11 March 1934. The race started in Paris and finished in Nice. The race was won by Gaston Rebry.

General classification

References

1934
1934 in road cycling
1934 in French sport
March 1934 sports events